Secwepemc Nation may refer to:

the Secwepemc people (aka the Shuswap people)
the Shuswap Nation Tribal Council
the Northern Shuswap Tribal Council